Edwin Hickman Ewing (December 2, 1809 – April 24, 1902) was an American politician and a member of the United States House of Representatives for Tennessee's 8th congressional district.

Biography
Ewing was born in Nashville, and after completing preparatory studies, he graduated from the University of Nashville in 1827, studied law, and was admitted to the bar in 1831. He began practicing law in Nashville and became a trustee of the University of Nashville in 1831, serving until his death. In 1841 and 1842, Hickman was a member of the Tennessee House of Representatives. He married Rebecca Williams in 1832 in Nashville, Tennessee.

Career
Elected as a Whig to the Twenty-ninth Congress, Ewing served from January 2, 1846 to March 3, 1847, and was not a candidate for renomination, and resumed practicing law with his brother Andrew Ewing, until 1851. His health was failing and he took a trip abroad beginning on April 2, 1851, and was absent eighteen months.

In 1857 he bought a plantation in Rutherford County, and moved there, but returned to Nashville in 1859 with his son-in-law and daughter, Mr. and Mrs. Emmet Eakin, and lived with them for a year, when they removed to Saline County, Missouri, near Marshall. In 1860 he again removed to Murfreesboro, Tennessee to live with his son, Josiah W. Ewing, intending to practice law no more. After the Civil War, he was appointed president of the University of Nashville.

Death
Ewing died in Murfreesboro, Tennessee on April 24, 1902 (age 92 years, 143 days), and is interred at Murfreesboro City Cemetery.  He was the brother of fellow congressman Andrew Ewing.

References

External links

Members of the Tennessee House of Representatives
1809 births
1902 deaths
University of Nashville alumni
Politicians from Nashville, Tennessee
Tennessee lawyers
Whig Party members of the United States House of Representatives from Tennessee
19th-century American politicians